Sanjiv Buttoo is a Senior News Editor BBC News. He is Executive Editor of BBC Radio Leeds. Previously Managing Editor of BBC Radio York (2014–2015), Assistant Editor BBC Radio Lancashire (2012–2014), Senior North of England Correspondent BBC Asian Network (from 2001). He has been head of Community Programmes for BBC North West, and a reporter/producer with the BBC's Investigation Unit.

Sanjiv has worked with BBC World Service in South Asia and the Middle East, and has reported for BBC Look North and BBC North West Tonight. He has covered terrorism, natural disasters and political unrest in South Asia; reported, produced and presented current affairs programmes and documentaries; and written for BBC News Online.

Awards
2000 'Best UK Radio Journalist' at the EMMA Awards

2008 'Sony Radio Academy Gold Award' for news documentary "Britain's Missing Girls", which uncovered the hidden practice of female foeticide in the UK

2015 'Best in Media' at the British Indian Awards

2018 'Local Radio Station of the Year' at the (ARIAS) The Radio Academy

References 

BBC News people
Living people
Date of birth missing (living people)
Year of birth missing (living people)